Dragontorc is an action-adventure game developed by Steve Turner's Graftgold and released for the Amstrad CPC and ZX Spectrum by Hewson Consultants in 1985. It is a sequel to 1984's Avalon The 3D Adventure Movie. The hero of Avalon, Maroc the Mage, returns to defeat an evil witch and save Britain. The game was very well received by critics.

Plot
Maroc the Mage has defeated the Lord of Chaos. Now he must stop Morag the Shape-Shifter, the Witch Queen of the North, from inheriting the terrible power of the legendary Dragontorc of Avalon. To reactivate it and achieve her evil ambitions, Morag needs to gather the five crowns of the kingdoms of Britain. She has manipulated the Saxons to fight against the kings so she can steal the five crowns, and has already caused the death of King Vortigern and seized the crown of Dumnonia. To save the realm, Maroc sets out to seek out and destroy the remaining crowns, infiltrate the citadel of Morag to find and kill her, and free the Merlyn, his mentor who has been enchanted by Morag.

Reception
The game was overall very well received. Amstrad Action gave it an 86%, Amtix gave it a 91%, Popular Computing Weekly gave it five (for the original Spectrum version) and four (for the Amstrad port) TV sets out of five, and ZX Computing gave it five stars out of five. Clare Edgeley of Sinclair User wrote: "Avalon fans will love Dragon Torc, which is more user friendly. The puzzles are well hidden and tricky. If you have never played Avalon, however, start with Dragon Torc, it is the better game." A review in Crash hailed it for "an excellent balance of incentive and difficulty," acclaiming it for "excellent" graphics but noting regarding the sound that "music is great but there’s little else," and awarded it a score of 92%. In 1991, Crash staff ranked Dragontorc as the 99th top Spectrum game.

References

External links
Dragontorc at MobyGames

1985 video games
Action-adventure games
Amstrad CPC games
Fantasy video games set in the Middle Ages
Graftgold games
Single-player video games
Video games about witchcraft
Video games based on Arthurian legend
Video games based on Celtic mythology
Video games developed in the United Kingdom
ZX Spectrum games
Hewson Consultants games